Aspirant Herber was one of seven s built for the French Navy in the first decade of the 20th century.

Design and description
The Spahi-class was over 50 percent larger than the preceding  to match the increase in size of foreign destroyers. The ships displaced  at deep load. Their crew numbered 77–79 officers and men.

Aspirante Heber was powered by two triple-expansion steam engines, each driving one propeller shaft using steam provided by four Guyot boilers.

The primary armament of the Spahi-class ships consisted of six  Modèle 1902 guns in single mounts, one each fore and aft of the superstructure and the others were distributed amidships. They were also fitted with three  torpedo tubes. One of these was in a fixed mount in the bow and the other two were on single rotating mounts amidships.

Construction and career
Aspirante Herber was built by Arsenal de Lorient and was launched on 30 April 1912. She was completed in August 1912.

References

Bibliography

 

Spahi-class destroyers
Ships built in France
1912 ships